The 1973 Horsham District Council election was the first ever for the council and took place on 7 June 1973 to elect members of Horsham District Council in England. It was held on the same day as other local elections. Independent councillors secured a majority of two with 23 seats, the Conservatives won 17 and the Liberal Party won 2. Labour also took part in the elections, fielding candidates in Horsham South & Horsham North only. The Liberal Party were successful in Broadbridge Heath and they were able to secure a seat in Storrington. The Conservative Party achieved good results in some rural areas but they were able to win the vast amount of their seats in the town. Independent councillors won a majority of seats in the villages in the district, sometimes unopposed, some later stood as a Conservative candidate three years later in the next set of elections for the Council.

Council Composition 

After the election, the composition of the council was:

Results summary

|}

Ward results

Ashington & Washington

Billingshurst

Bramber & Upper Beeding

Broadbridge Heath

Cowfold

Henfield

Horsham South

Horsham West

Horsham North

Nuthurst

Pulborough & Coldwatham

Roffey

Rudgwick

Rusper

Shipley

Slinfold

Southwater

Steyning

Storrington

Sullington

Thakeham

Warnham

West Chiltington

West Grinstead

References

1973 English local elections
June 1973 events in the United Kingdom
1973
1970s in West Sussex